A smiley, sometimes referred to as a smiley face, is a basic ideogram that represents a smiling face. Since the 1950s it has become part of popular culture worldwide, used either as a standalone ideogram, or as a form of communication, such as emoticons. The smiley began as two dots and a line to represent eyes and a mouth. More elaborate designs in the 1950s emerged, with noses, eyebrows, and outlines. A yellow and black design was used by New York-based radio station WMCA for its "Good Guys" campaign in the early 1960s. More yellow-and-black designs appeared in the 1960s and '70s, including works by Franklin Loufrani and Harvey Ross Ball. Today, The Smiley Company holds many rights to the smiley ideogram and has become one of the biggest licensing companies globally.

In  October of 1971  Loufrani trademarked the name and his design in France while working as a journalist for France Soir. Competing terms were used such as smiling face and happy face before consensus was reached on the term smiley, less often spelled "smilie".

Today, the smiley face has evolved from an ideogram into a template for communication and use in written language. This began with Scott Fahlman in the 1980s when he first theorized ASCII characters could be used to create faces and demonstrate emotion in text. Since then, those Fahlman's designs have become digital pictograms, known as emoticons. They are loosely based on the ideograms designed in the 1960s and 70s, continuing with the yellow and black design.

Terminology
The earliest known use of "smiley" as an adjective for "having a smile" or "smiling" in print was in 1848. James Russell Lowell used the line "All kin' o' smily roun' the lips" in his poem The Courtin’. Early designs were often called "smiling face" or "happy face." In 1961 the WMCA's Good Guys, incorporated a black smiley onto a yellow sweatshirt, and it was nicknamed the "happy face." The Spain brothers and Harvey Ross Ball both had designs in the 70s that concentrated more on slogans than the actual name of the smiley.
When Ball's design was completed, it was not given an official name. It was however labeled as "The Smile Insurance Company" which appeared on the back of the badges he created. The label was due to the fact the badges were designed for commercial use for an insurance company. The Spain brothers used the slogan Have a nice day, which is now frequently known for the slogan rather than the naming of the smiley.

The word smiley was used by Franklin Loufrani in France, when he registered his smiley design for trademark while working as a journalist for France Soir in 1971. The smiley accompanied positive news in the newspaper and eventually became the foundation for the licensing operation, The Smiley Company.

The name smiley became commonly used in the 70s and 80s as the yellow and black ideogram began to appear more in popular culture. The ideogram has since been used as a foundation to create emoticon emojis. These are digital interpretations of the smiley ideogram and have since become the most commonly used set of emojis since they adopted by Unicode in 2006 onwards. Smiley has since become a broader term that often includes both the ideogram design, but also emojis that use the same yellow and black design.

Ideogram history

Early history of smiling faces
For thousands of years, smiling faces have been used as ideograms and as pictograms. The oldest known smiling face was found by a team of archaeologists led by Nicolò Marchetti of the University of Bologna. Marchetti and his team pieced together fragments of a Hittite pot from approximately 1700 BC that had been found in Karkamış, Turkey. Once the pot had been pieced together, the team noticed that the item had a large smiling face engraved on it, becoming the first item with such a design to be found.

The Danish poet and author Johannes V. Jensen was amongst other things famous for experimenting with the form of his writing. In a letter sent to publisher Ernst Bojesen in December 1900, he includes both a happy face and a sad face.  It wasn't until the 1900s that the design evolved from a basic eye and mouth design, into a more recognisable design.

In the Russian newspaper "Ekaterinburgskaya Nedelya" dated May 28, 1896, the first case of the use of emoticons in Russia was recorded (it is possible that these are the first printed emoticons in history): in a humorous heading, four emoticons were depicted with typographical symbols and punctuation marks - and four emotions of a visitor to the fair Petersburg merchant

One of the first known commercial uses of a smiling face was in 1919, when the Buffalo Steam Roller Company in Buffalo, New York applied stickers on receipts with the word "thanks" and a smiling face above it. The face contained a lot of detail, having eyebrows, nose, teeth, chin and facial creases, reminiscent of "man-in-the-moon" style characteristics. Another early commercial use of a smiling face was in 1922 when the Gregory Rubber Company of Akron, Ohio ran an ad for "smiley face" balloons in The Billboard This smiley face had hair, a nose, teeth, pie eyes, and triangles over the eyes.

Ingmar Bergman's 1948 film Port of Call includes a scene where the unhappy Berit draws a sad face  closely resembling the modern "frowny", but including a dot for the nose  in lipstick on her mirror, before being interrupted. In 1953 and 1958, similar happy faces were used in promotional campaigns for the films Lili (1953) and Gigi (1958). In the early 1960s, The Funny Company, an American children's TV programmer, had a noseless Smiling face used as kids' club logo; the closing credits ended with the message, "Keep Smiling!"

The yellow and black happy face
In recent times, the face now known as a smiley has evolved into a well-known image and brand, recognisable for its yellow and black features. Despite the use of smiling faces in popular culture during the early 20th century in the United States, no one in the 1960s had commercialized a smiley-design. The first time a combination of yellow and black was used for a smiling face was in late 1962, when New York City radio station WMCA released a yellow sweatshirt as part of a marketing campaign. By 1963, over 11,000 sweatshirts had been given away. They had featured in Billboard magazine and numerous celebrities had also been pictured wearing them, including actress Patsy King and Mick Jagger. The radio station used the happy face as part of a competition for listeners. When the station called listeners, any listener who answered their phone "WMCA Good Guys!" was rewarded with a "WMCA good guys" sweatshirt that incorporated the yellow and black happy face into its design. The features of the WMCA smiley was a yellow face, with black dots as eyes and had a slightly crooked smile. The outline of the face was also not smooth to give it more of a hand drawn look. Originally, the yellow and black sweatshirt (sometimes referred to as gold), had WMCA Good Guys written on the front with no smiley face.

A number of United States-based designers created yellow and black happy faces over the next decade. In Worcester, Massachusetts, graphic designer Harvey Ross Ball created a happy face to raise the morale of the employees at the State Mutual Life Assurance Company.  Ball created the design in ten minutes and was paid $45. His rendition, with a bright yellow background, dark oval eyes, full smile, and creases at the sides of the mouth, was imprinted on more than fifty million buttons and became familiar around the world. The design is so simple that it is certain that similar versions were produced before 1963, including those cited above. However, Ball's rendition, as described here, has become the most iconic version. In 1967, Seattle graphic artist George Tenagi drew his own version at the request of advertising agent, David Stern. Tenagi's design was used in an advertising campaign for Seattle-based University Federal Savings & Loan. The ad campaign was inspired by Lee Adams's lyrics in "Put on a Happy Face" from the musical Bye Bye Birdie. Stern, the man behind this campaign, also later incorporated the Happy Face in his run for Seattle mayor in 1993. The Philadelphia-based brothers, Bernard and Murray Spain, also used the design on novelty items. They focused on the slogan "have a happy day", which mutated into "have a nice day." As with Harvey Ball, they also produced happy face badges, producing over 50 million with New York button manufacturer NG Slater.

Evolution into the smiley
In 1972, Frenchman Franklin Loufrani legally trademarked the use of a smiley face. He used it to highlight the good news parts of the newspaper France Soir. He simply called the design "Smiley" and launched The Smiley Company. In 1996 Loufrani's son Nicolas Loufrani took over the family business and built it into a multinational corporation. Nicolas Loufrani was outwardly skeptical of Harvey Ball's claim to creating the first smiley face. While noting that the design that his father came up with and Ball's design were nearly identical, Loufrani argued that the design is so simple that no one person can lay claim to having created it. As evidence for this, Loufrani's website points to early cave paintings found in France (dating from 2500 BC) that he claims are the first depictions of a smiley face. Loufrani also points to a 1960 radio ad campaign that reportedly made use of a similar design.

The rights to the Smiley trademark in one hundred countries are owned by the Smiley Company. Its subsidiary SmileyWorld Ltd, in London, headed by Nicolas Loufrani, creates or approves all the Smiley products sold in countries where it holds the trademark. The Smiley brand and logo have significant exposure through licensees in sectors such as clothing, home decoration, perfumery, plush, stationery, publishing, and through promotional campaigns. The Smiley Company is one of the 100 biggest licensing companies in the world, with a turnover of US$167 million in 2012. The first Smiley shop opened in London in the Boxpark shopping centre in December 2011.

In 2022, there was a number of birthday celebrations for the smiley. Many of these came in the form of collaborations between The Smiley Company and large retailers, such as Nordstrom.

Language and communication 

The earliest known smiley-like image in a written document was drawn by a Slovak notary to indicate his satisfaction with the state of his town's municipal financial records in 1635. The gold smiling face was drawn on the bottom of the legal document, appearing next to lawyer's Jan Ladislaides signature.

A disputed early use of the smiley in a printed text may have been in Robert Herrick's poem To Fortune (1648), which contains the line "Upon my ruins (smiling yet :)". Journalist Levi Stahl has suggested that this may have been an intentional "orthographic joke", while this occurrence is likely merely the colon placed inside parentheses rather than outside of them as is standard typographic practice today: "(smiling yet):". There are citations of similar punctuation in a non-humorous context, even within Herrick's own work. It is likely that the parenthesis was added later by modern editors.

On the Internet, the smiley has become a visual means of conveyance that uses images. The first known mention on the Internet was on 19 September 1982, when Scott Fahlman from Carnegie Mellon University wrote:

Yellow graphical smileys have been used for many different purposes, including use in early 1980s video games. Yahoo! Messenger (from 1998) used smiley symbols in the user list next to each user, and also as an icon for the application.  In November 2001, and later, smiley emojis inside the actual chat text was adopted by several chat systems, including Yahoo Messenger.

The smiley is the printable version of characters 1 and 2 of (black-and-white versions of) codepage 437 (1981) of the first IBM PC and all subsequent PC compatible computers. For modern computers, all versions of Microsoft Windows after Windows 95 can use the smiley as part of Windows Glyph List 4, although some computer fonts miss some characters.

The smiley face was included in Unicode's Miscellaneous Symbols from version 1.1 (1993).

Later additions to Unicode included a large number of variants expressing a range of human emotions, in particular with the addition of the "Emoticons" and "Supplemental Symbols and Pictographs blocks in Unicode versions 6.0 (2010) and 8.0 (2015), respectively.
These were introduced for compatibility with the ad-hoc implementation of emoticons by Japanese telephone carriers in unused ranges of the Shift JIS standard.
This resulted in a de facto standard in the range with lead bytes 0xF5 to 0xF9.
KDDI has gone much further than this, and has introduced hundreds more in the space with lead bytes 0xF3 and 0xF4.

In popular culture 
The smiley has now become synonymous with culture across the world. It is used for communication, imagery, branding and for topical purposes to display a range of emotions. Beginning in the 1960s, a yellow happy face was used by numerous brands in print to demonstrate happiness.

In print
Franklin Loufrani used the word smiley when he designed a smiling face for the newspaper he was working for at the time. The Loufrani design came in 1971, when Loufrani designed a smiley face for the newspaper, France-Soir. The newspaper used Loufrani's smiley to highlight stories that they defined as "feel-good news." This particular smiley went onto form The Smiley Company. Mad magazine notably used the smiley a year later in 1972 across their entire front page for the April edition of the magazine. This was one of the first instances that the smiling face had been adapted, with one of the twenty visible smileys pulling a face.

In the United States, there were many instances of smiling faces in the 1900s. However, the first industry to mass adopt the smiley was in comics and cartoons.

The logo for and cover of the omnibus edition of the Watchmen comic book series is a smiley badge, worn by the character the Comedian, with blood splattered on it from the murder which initiates the events of the story.

In the DC Comics, shady businessman "Boss Smiley" (a political boss with a smiley face for a head) makes several appearances.

Music and film
As music genres began to create their own cultures from the 1970s onwards, many cultures began to incorporate a smiling face into their culture. In the late 1970s, the American band Dead Kennedys launched their first recording, "California über alles". The single cover was a collage aimed to look like that of a Nazi rally prior to World War II. It featured three of the vertical banners commonly used at such rallies, but with the usual swastikas replaced by large smileys. In the UK, the happy face has been associated with psychedelic culture since Ubi Dwyer and the Windsor Free Festival in the 1970s and the electronic dance music culture, particularly with acid house, that emerged during the Second Summer of Love in the late 1980s. The association was cemented when the band Bomb the Bass used an extracted smiley from the comic book series Watchmen on the center of its "Beat Dis" hit single.

In addition to the movie adaptation of Watchmen, the film Suicide Squad has the character Deadshot staring into the window of a clothing store. Behind a line of mannequins is a yellow smiley face pin, which had been closely associated to another DC comic character, Comedian. The 2001 film Evolution has a three-eyed smiley for its logo. It was later carried onto the movie's spin-off cartoon, Alienators: Evolution Continues.

In the film Forrest Gump it is implied the titular character inspired the smiley face design after wiping his face on a T-shirt while running coast to coast.

In the late-1980s, the smiley again became a prominent image within the music industry. It was adopted during the growth of acid house across Europe and the UK in the late 1980s. According to many, this began when DJ, Danny Rampling, used the smiley to celebrate Paul Oakenfold's birthday. This sparked a movement where the smiley moved into various dance genres, becoming a symbol of 1980s dance music.

In 2022, David Guetta collaborated with Felix Da Housecat and Kittin to release the song, Silver Screen, a reimagined version of the 2001 dance track. Guetta's version celebrated positivity and happiness. The music video features a cameo from street artist, André Saraiva and portrays different groups portraying the message "Take The Time To Smile." The video partners that message with numerous smileys, on the side of buildings, on placards and on posters.

Physical products
Vittel announced in 2017 that they would be using the smiley on a special edition design of its water bottles. AdAge referred to its use as a "feel-good effect" and water bottles using the smiley icon had an 11.8% increase in sales, compared to the standard bottles, with 128 million bottles sold across Europe which featured the smiley-design.
In the UK, "Jammie Dodgers", a legendary biscuit line, incorporate the smiley engraved into circular cookies.

Art and fashion
As part of his early works, graffiti artist Banksy frequently used the smiley in his art. The first of his major works that included a smiley was his Flying Copper portrait, which was completed in 2004. It was during a period when Banksy experimented with working on canvas and paper portraits. He also used the smiley in 2005 to replace the face of the grim reaper. The image became known as "grin reaper." In 2007, The Smiley Company partnered with Moschino for the campaign, "Smiley for Moschino."

During the Covid-19 pandemic, fashion label Pull & Bear announced they would be releasing t-shirts with a smiley design incorporated on the front. Other fashion labels that have used the smiley on their garments include H&M and Zara. The smiley has also featured on high-end fashion lines, including Fendi and Moncler. High end French jeweller Valerie Messika produced white gold and yellow pendants, which contained a smiley face.

For the 50th birthday of the Smiley, Galeries Lafayette in Paris, Beijing and Shanghai and 10 Nordstrom department stores sold limited edition smiley products to commemorate the anniversary. During the same year, Lee Jeans announced the launch of a new clothing collection, Lee x Smiley.

Gaming
In 1980, Namco released the now famous Pac-man, a yellow faced cartoon character. In 2008, the video game Battlefield: Bad Company used the yellow smiley as part of its branding for the game. The smiley appeared throughout the game and also on the cover. The smiley normally appeared on the side of a grenade, which is something that became synonymous with the Battlefield series.

The 1987 Atari ST game MIDI Maze, released on other platforms as Faceball 2000, features round, yellow Smileys as enemies. When a player is eliminated, these enemies taunt the player with the phrase "Have a nice day."

Other uses
During the London 2012 opening ceremony, early on in the show a number of giant yellow beach balls were released into the audience. Each had a large smiley face. Walmart uses a smiley face as its mascot. In 2022, Assouline published "50 Years of Good News," a breakdown of the cultural development of the smiley and its use.

In 2022, the International Day of Happiness was celebrated by projecting a smiley onto a number of landmarks around the globe. In Seoul, South Korea, a smiley celebrating happiness was projected onto The Seoul Tower.

Ownership and alternative smileys

In 1997, Franklin Loufrani attempted to trademark rights to the ideogram he created in the United States. Wal-Mart contested his application, as it began using its "Rolling Back Prices" campaign a year prior. The fallout led to a 2002 court case, and a seven-year ongoing case. The fallout resulted in Wal-Mart phasing out the use of the smiley in 2006. Despite that, Wal-Mart sued an online parodist for alleged "trademark infringement" after he used the symbol. The District Court found in favor of the parodist when in March 2008, the judge concluded that Wal-Mart's smiley face logo was not shown to be " inherently distinctive " and that it "has failed to establish that the smiley face has acquired secondary meaning or that it is otherwise a protectable trademark" under U.S. law.   In June 2010, Wal-Mart and The Smiley Company founded by Loufrani settled their 10-year-old dispute in front of the Chicago federal court. The terms remain confidential. In 2016, Wal-Mart brought back the smiley face on its website, social media profiles, and in selected stores.

The band Nirvana created its own smiley design in 1991. It was claimed that Kurt Cobain was the designer of the Nirvana smiley, and following his death was one of the reasons why it became so iconic. As recently as 2020, media reports suggested a Los Angeles-based freelance designer was in fact behind the designs.

Fashion house Marc Jacobs designed a smiley in 2018, which had a yellow outline, with the letters M and J replacing the eyes. The mouth design was similar to the original Nirvana design. In January 2019, legal representatives of Nirvana announced they were suing Marc Jacobs for a breach of copyright. Following the announcement by a judge in Los Angeles that the suit could move forward, Marc Jacobs announced a countersuit against Nirvana. In 2020, a Los Angeles-based designer suggested that he was the creator of the Nirvana smiley and therefore became an interjector in the case between Nirvana and Marc Jacobs.

See also 

 Acid2
 Body language
 Emoji
 Emoticon
 Facial Action Coding System
 Galle (Martian crater)
 Kolobok
 Mr. Yuk
 Pac-Man (character)
 Pareidolia
 Red John
 Social intelligence

References 

Emoticons
Face
Pictograms
Typographical symbols